Stephan "Steff" Eberharter (born 24 March 1969) is a former World Cup alpine ski racer from Austria.

Biography
Born in Brixlegg, Tyrol, Eberharter was the winner of the overall World Cup title in 2002 and 2003, as well as the season titles in downhill and super-G. He was the nearest rival of compatriot Hermann Maier in the late 1990s and early 2000s. Eberharter retired from international competition following the conclusion of the 2003–04 season.

Career
Eberharter made his World Cup debut during the 1990 season at age 20, where he finished 32nd in the overall standings. The next year he finished second in the super-G standings and won two gold medals at the 1991 World Championships in Saalbach, the super-G and combined. He was voted the Austrian Sportspersonality of the year for 1991.

After injury setbacks, he became particularly successful in the downhill event, and finished third in the downhill standings in 1998 and was the runner-up in 2001. His nemesis on the snow, teammate Maier, was involved in a serious motorcycle accident in August 2001 which sidelined him for the 2002 season. In Maier's absence, Eberharter went on to take the overall World Cup title (and downhill and super-G) in 2002 and 2003.

Eberharter enjoyed success at the World Championships and Olympic Games as well. In 1991 in Saalbach, he won two gold medals in the super-G and combined events. Twelve years later, at St. Moritz in 2003, he took gold in the super-G event again. At the 1998 Winter Olympics in Nagano, Japan, he finished second in the giant slalom, but went on to take gold in the same event at the 2002 Winter Olympics in Salt Lake City, where he also won the bronze medal in the downhill, and took silver in the super-G.

In his final season in 2004, Eberharter won four downhills and the downhill season title; he had twelve podiums, was second in the overall standings, and third in Super-G.

World Cup results

Season titles
 7 titles – (2 overall, 3 DH, 2 SG)

Season standings

Race victories
 29 wins – (18 DH, 6 SG, 5 GS)
 75 podiums – (38 DH, 24 SG, 13 GS)

World Championship results

Olympic results

See also
Ski World Cup Most podiums & Top 10 results

References

External links
 
 
 Steff.at – personal site – 

1969 births
People from Kufstein District
Austrian male alpine skiers
Alpine skiers at the 1992 Winter Olympics
Alpine skiers at the 1998 Winter Olympics
Alpine skiers at the 2002 Winter Olympics
Olympic alpine skiers of Austria
Medalists at the 1998 Winter Olympics
Medalists at the 2002 Winter Olympics
Olympic medalists in alpine skiing
Olympic gold medalists for Austria
Olympic silver medalists for Austria
Olympic bronze medalists for Austria
FIS Alpine Ski World Cup champions
Living people
Recipients of the Decoration of Honour for Services to the Republic of Austria
Sportspeople from Tyrol (state)
20th-century Austrian people
21st-century Austrian people